John Joseph Jeffers (5 October 1968 – 20 January 2021) was an English footballer who played as a left-winger. He scored 18 goals in 297 league and cup appearances in a 12-year career in the Football League.

He began his career with Liverpool in October 1986, but never made a first team appearance before he was sold on to Port Vale in February 1989 for a £30,000 fee. He helped the "Valiants" to win promotion out of the third tier in 1989 and 1993–94. Known for his dribbling and jinking runs, he was nicknamed "Jinking John Jeffers" by Vale supporters. He was loaned out to Shrewsbury Town in January 1995, he was allowed to join Stockport County in November 1995. He helped the "Hatters" to win promotion out of the Second Division and to reach the semi-finals of the League Cup in 1996–97. In October 1997, he moved into non-league football with Hednesford Town, before retiring from professional football at the end of the season.

Career

Port Vale
Jeffers turned professional at Kenny Dalglish's Liverpool in October 1986, but was never able to provide too much first-team competition for John Barnes, and never featured at Anfield. He was loaned out to Port Vale as cover for the injured Paul Atkinson in December 1988; he was recalled by the "Reds" in February 1989 but was brought back to Port Vale permanently the next month for a fee of £30,000. To fund the transfer Rudge sold Steve Harper to Preston North End for £35,000. He featured in 15 Third Division games in the 1988–89 season, and featured in all four play-off games, including both legs of the play-off final victory over Bristol Rovers. He scored his first league goal on 4 November 1989, in a 2–1 defeat to Oxford United at Vale Park. He played a total of 46 games in the 1989–90 season, as the "Valiants" posted a top-half finish in the Second Division. He scored twice in 36 games during the 1990–91 campaign, but started to become plagued by abdominal injuries from March onwards. He scored three goals in 38 appearances in the 1991–92 season, as the "Valiants" suffered relegation in last place. He scored twice in 34 games in the 1992–93 season, but did not feature at Wembley either in the League Trophy Final win over Stockport County or the play-off Final defeat to West Bromwich Albion. He did though help John Rudge's side to win promotion with a second-place finish in the 1993–94 campaign; they finished just one point behind champions Reading. He lost his first-team place in the 1994–95 season, as Vale posted a 17th-place finish in the second tier (known as the First Division due to the creation of the Premier League).

Later career
Jeffers went on a one-month loan to Fred Davies's Shrewsbury Town in January 1995, and featured in three Second Division games at Gay Meadow. In August 1995, he had a trial with Second Division Stockport County, before he was allowed to join the club on a free transfer in November 1995. Dave Jones's County finished just three points outside the play-offs in 1995–96, with Jeffers playing 23 league games. He scored three goals in 34 league and eight League Cup appearances in the 1996–97 season, as he helped the "Hatters" to win promotion as runners-up; they finished just two points behind champions Bury. The club also reached the semi-finals of the League Cup, defeating Chesterfield, Sheffield United, Blackburn Rovers, West Ham United and Southampton on the way. In the semi-finals, they lost 2–0 to Middlesbrough at Edgeley Park, and exited the competition despite managing a 1–0 win at the Riverside Stadium. Despite these successes, he joined Conference club Hednesford Town in October 1997, and then left Keys Park and retired at the close of the 1997–98 season.

Style of play
Jeffers was a skilful and entertaining, though inconsistent winger. His talent made him a cult hero at Port Vale, where he was known as ‘Jinking Johnny’ , though he could be prone to overplaying rather than delivering timely crosses.

Personal life
John Jeffers died on 19 January 2021, aged 52, following a long illness. He had two sons: John and Gabriel.

Career statistics

Honours
Port Vale
Football League Third Division play-offs: 1989
Football League Second Division second-place promotion: 1993–94

Stockport County
Football League Second Division second-place promotion: 1996–97

References

1968 births
2021 deaths
Footballers from Liverpool
English footballers
Association football wingers
Liverpool F.C. players
Port Vale F.C. players
Shrewsbury Town F.C. players
Stockport County F.C. players
Hednesford Town F.C. players
English Football League players
National League (English football) players